Fargau-Pratjau is a municipality in the district of Plön, in Schleswig-Holstein, Germany.

Between 1990 and 2011, the Jazz Baltica festival was held annually here.

References

Plön (district)